Tom Clarke (born 11 March 1986) is an English multi-instrumentalist known as the lead vocalist of the British indie rock band The Enemy.

Clarke has performed on both albums, playing guitar, piano and strings on We'll Live and Die in These Towns. He appeared as guest on Noel Fielding's team on the first episode of series 23 of Never Mind the Buzzcocks.

Personal life
On 14 April 2009, The Sun reported that Tom Clarke had purchased a 1972 Jaguar E Type because it reminded him of his grandfather. The singer said "in 1972 my granddad used to work in Jaguar's Brown's Lane plant in Coventry and I wanted a car he'd worked on – whenever I look at the car I think of him".

In January 2010, Gigwise reported that Clarke had acquired a "ridiculous farm" and was taking a short break from music to decorate. Clarke stated that the band was rehearsing and was writing new Enemy material prolifically.

In October 2016, he finished his last Enemy gig by proposing to unsuspecting girlfriend and tour DJ Kate Frost.

Gumball Rally
In 2009, Tom Clarke drove a Jaguar XKR with in the famous "Gumball 3000 Rally" an annual 3,000-mile international road rally which takes place on public roads featuring mostly exotic and powerful sports cars. Clarke is alleged to have been landed with a $5,000 bill during the course of the rally for wrecking a hotel suite with friends from Dirty Sanchez, whilst celebrating the band's second album reaching number two in the UK Albums Chart. Monster Energy, one of the rally sponsors, awarded Clarke and his co driver and fellow band member Tom Boddy, The 2009 Monster Energy Award for Bad Behaviour.

Car accident
On 29 August 2010, The Sun Newspaper reported that Clarke had "totalled his new sports car just days after getting it." Clarke said he "lost it in the outside lane of the A90 near Aberdeen, The car, a TVR 350c, spun four times before hitting a barrier, then it left the road and went over a bollard before wrapping around a parking sign." The newspaper report said that the singer was not injured, and Clarke compared the crash to the feeling of falling over when trying to put your boxers on. He also urged festival goers to drive safely.

Art gallery bid
In June 2010, Clarke backed an art gallery's bid to win the UK's largest single arts prize. The Herbert Art Gallery in Coventry was shortlisted for the £100,000 prize. The singer said winning the award would make The Herbert Art Gallery and Museum a "jewel in the crown of Coventry". Clarke said, "The Herbert means a lot to me personally, as we did one of our first ever gigs downstairs. No band had played here before us, and not many people knew the gallery was here".

Race For Heroes
On 27 February 2010, Clarke participated in the "Race For Heroes" alongside stars of British motorsport and British soldiers for the Help For Heroes organisation. The six-hour endurance race aimed to raise money and awareness for the charity.

XFM controversy
In September 2007, Alex Zane, presenter of the XFM Breakfast show broadcast a statement declaring that the band would not be played on his show again. After playing their single "You're Not Alone" for seven seconds, he reasoned that altercations between himself and the band (notably Tom) over a television interview meant that they would no longer be played by him. He stated that Clarke said "disgusting, offensive, hateful things". However, during the Xfm Review of 2008, the presenters Sunta Templeton and Matt Dyson commented on the band and Zane making up just after playing their record "Away from Here".

References

External links
 Gigwise article – Tom Clarke acquires a farm
 Gumball 3000 Rally news – Tom Clarke
 Monster Energy Award for “Bad Behaviour”: Tom Clarke & Tom Boddy of The Enemy – 2009 Jaguar XKR
 Tom Clarke backs art fund – Coventry Telegraph
 The Enemy make personal call to fans Clarke Sustains Hand Injury Riding Motorcycle

1986 births
Living people
English rock musicians
Musicians from Birmingham, West Midlands
Musicians from Coventry